Mads Christensen (born 6 April 1984) is a Danish former professional road and track cyclist.

Major results

2000
Junior National Track Championships
1st  Track time trial
1st  Individual pursuit
1st  Team pursuit
 1st  Road race, National Junior Road Championships
2001
 National Track Championships
1st  Madison
1st  Individual pursuit
1st  Team pursuit
Junior National Track Championships
1st  Individual pursuit
1st  Team pursuit
2003
 1st  Road race, National Under-23 Road Championships
 5th Overall Olympia's Tour
2004
 1st  Time trial, National Under-23 Road Championships
 2nd U23 Liège–Bastogne–Liège
 5th Overall Olympia's Tour
 6th Overall Ringerike GP
1st Stage 1
2007
 8th Grand Prix de la Ville de Lillers
2008
 6th Fyen Rundt
2009
 2nd Overall Rás Tailteann
 9th Overall Rhône-Alpes Isère Tour
2010
 2nd Overall Flèche du Sud
1st Stage 2
2011
 3rd Time trial, National Road Championships
2012
 1st  Mountains classification, Tour of the Basque Country
 6th Overall Tour de l'Ain
 7th Clásica de San Sebastián
2013
 8th Overall Circuit de la Sarthe

References

External links

Mads Christensen profile at Saxo Bank-SunGard

1984 births
Living people
Danish male cyclists
Sportspeople from Aalborg